Expresso II is the eighth studio album released under the name Gong and the de facto second album by Pierre Moerlen's Gong. It released in February 1978.

Featuring an all-instrumental jazz-driven sound, notable for the prominent use of vibraphone, it has little to do with the psychedelic space rock of Daevid Allen's Gong, even though the two bands share a common history. Although the album was issued by Virgin Records under the "Gong" name for contractual reasons, and the name "Pierre Moerlen's Gong" would not be adopted for a few more months, the lineup involved and the nature of the music are that of the Moerlen-led band.

This was the final Gong-related album released by Virgin; the band continued on Arista Records.

Track listing

Personnel
Pierre Moerlen's Gong
Pierre Moerlen – drums, vibraphone, xylophone, glockenspiel, tympani, tubular bells
Benoît Moerlen – vibraphone, marimba, xylophone, glockenspiel, percussion, claves, tubular bells
Mireille Bauer – marimba, vibraphone
Hansford Rowe – bass, rhythm guitar (2)
Additional personnel
Mick Taylor – lead guitar (1)
Allan Holdsworth – lead guitar (3, 4, 6), rhythm guitar (1)
Bon Lozaga – lead guitar (2), rhythm guitar (3)
Darryl Way – violin (3, 5)
François Causse – congas

In popular culture
The track "Heavy Tune" is featured on Fusion FM radio in the game Grand Theft Auto IV.

References

Macan, E. L., Macan, E. (1997). Rocking the Classics: English Progressive Rock and the Counterculture. Germany: Oxford University Press. p. 243

1978 albums
Gong (band) albums
Pierre Moerlen's Gong albums
Jazz fusion albums
Virgin Records albums